is a 2D action video game developed and published in Japan by ACQUIRE Corp. for the PlayStation Vita and Android.

Development 
The game was developed by ACQUIRE Corp. It was leaked by Japanese video game magazine Famitsu on September 7, 2011, and officially announced during Tokyo Game Show 2011 on September 16, 2011. It went on sale in Japan on February 6, 2012, and was published in North America by XSEED Games on March 20, 2012 under the title "Sumioni: Demon Arts". The game uses an art style which is reminiscent of Japanese sumi-e paintings.

XSEED Games announced on January, 2nd that it would be localizing the title for North American release within the PlayStation Vita's "launch-window" (launch window is often within the first 3-months of the hardware release).

The game has also been released on the Android platform exclusively for devices using nVidia's Tegra 3 chipset.

References

External links
Official website 
ACQUIRE Corp. website
North American Official Website
Google Play listing

2012 video games
Android (operating system) games
Platform games
Sony Interactive Entertainment games
PlayStation Vita games
Video games developed in Japan
Xseed Games games
Single-player video games
Acquire (company) games